William Leslie Briscoe (11 January 1892 – 18 May 1943) was an Australian rules footballer who played with Richmond in the Victorian Football League (VFL).

Briscoe came to Richmond from South Australian club West Torrens. He made 26 appearances for Richmond, over four seasons, during World War I. He later played for Brunswick, Port Melbourne and Hawthorn in the Victorian Football Association (VFA). From 1926 to 1928, Briscoe was a VFL boundary umpire, then a goal umpire in 1929. He officiated in a total of 51 league games.

References

1892 births
Australian rules footballers from South Australia
Richmond Football Club players
West Torrens Football Club players
Brunswick Football Club players
Port Melbourne Football Club players
Hawthorn Football Club (VFA) players
Australian Football League umpires
1943 deaths
Australian rules footballers from Melbourne
People from Preston, Victoria